Jake Riley may refer to:

People
Jake Riley, musician in L.T.D. (band)
Jake Riley (athlete) in 2010 NCAA Division I Outdoor Track and Field Championships
Jake Riley (ice hockey), represented Australia at the 2016 Winter Youth Olympics

Fictional characters
Jake Riley, fictional character in Three Sisters (TV series)
Jake Riley, fictional character in Containment (TV series)